The men's artistic team all-around competition at the 1956 Summer Olympics was held at the West Melbourne Stadium from 3 to 7 December. It was the eleventh appearance of the event.

Competition format

The gymnastics format continued to use the aggregation format, mostly following the scoring tweaks made in 1952. Each nation entered a team of six gymnasts (two alternates could be entered—in 1952, all eight gymnasts competed). All entrants in the gymnastics competitions performed both a compulsory exercise and a voluntary exercise for each apparatus. The top five individual scores in each exercise (that is, compulsory floor, voluntary floor, compulsory vault, etc.) were added to give a team score for that exercise. The 12 team exercise scores were summed to give a team total.

No separate finals were contested.

Exercise scores ranged from 0 to 10, apparatus scores from 0 to 20, individual totals from 0 to 120, and team scores from 0 to 600.

Results

References

Men's artistic team all-around
1952
Men's events at the 1956 Summer Olympics